Antaeotricha diacta is a moth of the family Depressariidae. It is found in French Guiana.

The wingspan is about 17 mm. The forewings are white, faintly fuscous-tinged on the dorsal area and with dark fuscous markings. There is a streak from the extreme base of the costa to one-fifth of the dorsum. The first discal and plical stigmata are moderate, the plical posterior, connected with the dorsum before the middle by some fuscous suffusion. There is a cloudy line from the costa before the middle to three-fourths of the dorsum, widely interrupted beneath the costa, marked with a stronger dot in the disc, expanded into a suffused spot towards the dorsum. A curved line is found from three-fourths of the costa to the tornus, somewhat sinuate inwards toward the costa and there are eight marginal dots around the apex and termen. The hindwings are whitish.

References

Moths described in 1916
diacta
Taxa named by Edward Meyrick
Moths of South America